:4 is the fourth studio album by United Kingdom acid jazz group Galliano. It was released in the UK on Gilles Peterson's Talkin' Loud imprint on Mercury Records on 19 August 1996. A single from the album, "Slack Hands" was used in the title sequence of Kevin Reynolds' 1997 film One Eight Seven, starring Samuel L. Jackson.

Track listing

Release history

References

1996 albums
Galliano (band) albums
Talkin' Loud albums